Moshe Ponte (also "Ponti"; ; born August 29, 1956) is an Israeli former Olympic judoka. He is the President of the Israel Judo Association.

He was born in Israel, and is Jewish.

Judo career
His coach was Morris Smadga.

Ponte competed for Israel at the 1984 Summer Olympics in Los Angeles, California, in judo.  In the Men's Half-Middleweight (U78) he came in tied for 20th, after losing to Michel Nowak of France, who won the bronze medal at the Olympics. When he competed in the Olympics he was 5-10.5 (180 cm) tall, and weighed 172 lbs (78 kg).

He won a silver medal at the Belgian Open Championships Visé in 1986 in the U86 category.

He coached Israeli Olympic bronze medalist Oren Smadja.

Ponte is the President of the Israel Judo Association.

References

External links
 
 
 

Living people
Israeli male judoka
Olympic judoka of Israel
1956 births
Judoka trainers
Judoka at the 1984 Summer Olympics
Israeli Jews
Jewish martial artists